Turban lily is a common name for several plant species and may refer to:

 Lilium martagon , native to Europe and Asia
 Lilium pomponium, native to France, Spain, and Italy